Sir Richard Wallace, 1st Baronet (21 June 1818 – 20 July 1890), of Sudbourne Hall in Suffolk, Hertford House in London, of Antrim Castle, County Antrim, Northern Ireland, of 2 Rue Laffitte, Paris, and of the Château de Bagatelle in Paris, was a British art collector and Francophile. Based on the Return of Owners of Land, 1873 he was the 24th richest man in the United Kingdom and the 73rd largest landowner, holding in total 72,307 acres, with a total annual value of £86,737. In addition he had valuable property in Paris and one of the greatest private art collections in the world, part of which, now known as the Wallace Collection, was donated to the UK Government by his widow, in accordance with his wishes.

Origins and youth 
Richard is believed to have been the illegitimate son of Richard Seymour-Conway, 4th Marquess of Hertford (1800–1870). He was born in London on 26 July 1818, to a certain Agnes Jackson, who according to Burns (2008) was in reality Mrs Agnes Bickley, the wife of Samuel Bickley, an insurance underwriter and member of Lloyds of London, and a daughter of Sir Thomas Dunlop Wallace, 5th Baronet (1750–1835), of Craigie Castle, Ayrshire, born "Thomas Dunlop", who had adopted the additional name and style of baronet on inheriting the Craigie estate of his grandfather Sir Thomas Wallace, 4th Baronet. It is unclear why his mother had adopted the surname Jackson, as she remained married to Samuel Bickley at the time of Richard's birth and bore Samuel legitimate children both before and after the birth. 

Richard's natural father, the 4th Marquess of Hertford, after whom he supposedly gained his first name, would have been 18 years old at his birth, and is supposed by Burns (2008) to have met Agnes in Brighton whilst serving in the 10th Hussars Regiment. He never married and Richard was his only offspring.

However, it was previously thought possible (as stated in the Dictionary of National Biography, 1900) that he was the uterine half-brother of the 4th Marquess, being a son by father unknown of Maria Emilia Fagnani, Marchioness of Hertford (1771–1856) ("Mie-Mie"), the estranged wife of Francis Charles Seymour-Conway, 3rd Marquess of Hertford (1777–1842) and mother of the 4th Marquess. Later in life, after 1870 during his court case concerning his contested inheritance from the 4th Marquess, Richard declined the opportunity to put his origins on public record, stating merely that "he had been brought from London to Paris in 1825 aged 7 with his nurse". It is however recorded in surviving correspondence that the 4th Marquess had given his distant cousin the 5th Marquess of Hertford "the most solemn assurance that he was not Mr. Wallace's father." It is possible that Wallace himself did not know the truth of the matter. However, he did at some point discover that his mother's maiden name was Wallace, and on 21st April 1842, aged 24, he was baptised in the Anglican Church in the Rue d'Aguesseau in Paris under the surname Wallace, with the certificate of baptism recording simply that the name of his parents was Wallace. Thenceforth he was known as Richard Wallace.

Move to France
In 1825, aged seven and known as "Richard Jackson", his mother Agnes Jackson left him in Paris under the care and education of "Mie-Mie", the mother of the 4th Marquess, who lived at 1 Rue Taitbout, 50 metres from the house of her son at 2 Rue Laffitte. Richard lived with Mie-Mie for the next 17 years until 1842 (two years after he had fathered his own son by his mistress) and the two developed a close bond. The 4th Marquess mentioned in his will the kindness that Richard had shown to his mother. He referred to her as "Aunt" and she to him as "Dear Nephew". This close relationship may have been sealed by the fact that both were illegitimate, Mie-Mie being the natural daughter of the 4th Duke of Queensbury by his Italian mistress. "They both suffered the stigma of illegitimacy, at a time when bloodlines in humans were as important as in horses. They both had to endure whispered gossip the moment they turned their backs, and the trail of scandal wherever they went" (Fairweather, 2021). Long after her death Wallace erected a monument to Mie-Mie in Sudbourne Church (the only one there to a Hertford in 120 years of residence) in the form of the stained-glass east window depicting Mary Magdalene, the prostitute who washed Jesus’s feet with oil but was also the first person to witness the Resurrection, which Fairweather (2021) suspected to be "an intentional reference to Mie-Mie’s circumstances".

Career
Most of his youth and early manhood were spent in Paris, "where as Monsieur Richard he became a well-known figure in French society and among those who devoted themselves to matters of art". He was appointed by the 4th Marquess as his secretary and agent, on a salary of £500, later raised to £1,000. In this capacity he became expert in assessing, valuing and buying works for the famous collector. Before he was forty he had made his own large collection including objets d'art, bronzes, ivories and miniatures, which collection he sold profitably in Paris in 1857, in order to pay off debts.

Inheritance
In 1870 his father the 4th Marquess died without legitimate issue, and the titles and entailed estates, including Ragley Hall in Warwickshire and Sudbourne, passed under an entail to a distant male cousin, who became the 5th Marquess. However Wallace inherited his father's unentailed estates and extensive collection of European art.

Lisburn, Northern Ireland

His vast estate in Lisburn, Northern Ireland, extending to over 50,000 acres, produced an annual income of £50,000 (£7 million in 2022). The area was the centre of the flax and linen industry. When Wallace visited it for the first time after his inheritance, accompanied by his wife and son, he was greeted by a crowd of 20,000 people and was welcomed in an elaborate series of ceremonies by the chief citizens. Even though at that time Lisburn was no longer the pocket borough it had been under the Hertford family before the Reform Act of 1832, Wallace was invited to stand as its Member of Parliament, and being unopposed, won the seat and so began his parliamentary career. He built a grand residence in the town for himself, called Wallace House, more exactly intended for his son whom he intended to establish there to perform the functions of a great landlord, designed by the same architect who had remodelled Hertford House. He made many large charitable donations to the town, and was greatly loved by the inhabitants. After his death various monuments were erected in his memory including two stained glass windows in Lisburn Cathedral, on the south wall of the chancel and on the south wall of the nave, one financed by public subscription, the other by Lady Wallace. Also the Wallace Memorial in Castle Gardens, erected in 1892 by the residents of Lisburn in "grateful recognition of his generous interest in the prosperity of the town," comprises a 40 foot high stone and marble "square-plan tower with a steep crocketed spire topped with a poppy head finial, the front gable bearing a date and coat of arms, niches on each façade, one bearing a bust of the subject above an inscribed tablet, and on a three-stepped octagonal base". It is inscribed:
To perpetuate the memory of one whose delight was to do good and in grateful recollection of his generous interest in the prosperity of this town of which it possesses so many proofs this monument is erected to Sir Richard Wallace, Bart., KGI, sometiome MP for the Borough of Lisburn, by the inhabitants of the town and neighbourhood Obiit Jul. XX, MDCCCXC.

His bequests to the town included the Wallace Park and The Wallace High School. His town house on Castle Street is now used as offices by the South Eastern Regional College.

Sudbourne

Wallace repurchased Sudbourne from the 5th Marquess, for £298,000. It was a notable sporting estate of about 12,000 acres, which became his English country seat and where he held lavish shooting parties, guests at which included the Prince of Wales. He employed 24 liveried gamekeepers and "a small army of domestic servants" to cater for his shooting guests. He commissioned three large oil paintings by the French artist Alfred Charles Ferdinand Decaen, depicting his shooting parties (On Sudbourne Hill (1874); Shooting Luncheon at the Great Wood Sudbourne (1876); Battue de perdreaux dans la comté de Suffolk (1880)), now displayed in Orford Town Hall. He was Honorary President of Ipswich Museum in Suffolk from 1874 until his death. In 1875 he built a model farm at nearby Chillesford Lodge on the estate, which survives today, displaying on some of the buildings his heraldic crest, also visible on several other houses and buildings erected by him on the estate. In 1883 he won a silver medal at the Smithfield Show as breeder of the best "Single Pig" in class LXXXVI. During 1879–82 he restored Sudbourne Church, and presented it with new furnishings. In 1877 Wallace appointed as Rector of Sudbourne and Orford parish churches Rev. Edward Maude Scott, the brother of his secretary and eventual heir Sir John Murray Scott, 1st Baronet. The latter is buried in Orford Churchyard beneath a tall stone cross within iron railings. Rev. Scott was instrumental in restoring St Bartholomew's Church in Orford between 1894 and 1901. In 1884 Wallace sold Sudbourne to the banker Arthur Heywood, and returned to Paris, having become disappointed in his ambition to found his own aristocratic dynasty due to his son's refusal to live in England and Queen Victoria's refusal to allow the latter to inherit his baronetcy, due to illegitimacy.

Château de Bagatelle

He also inherited the Château de Bagatelle, Neuilly-sur-Seine, with its 60 acre garden in the Bois de Boulogne, Paris, which his widow bequeathed, together with Hertford House in London and 2 Rue Laffitte, to Sir John Edward Arthur Murray Scott, 1st Baronet (1847–1912) "of Connaught Place", London. Scott was the eldest son of Dr. John Scott, a physician at Boulogne-sur-Seine, and had been appointed as Wallace's secretary, in which capacity he had helped with the charity work and with Wallace's return to England, together with his art collection, after the Siege of Paris. Scott remained as the principal advisor to Lady Wallace in her widowhood. In Scott's time it is described by Vita Sackville-West in Pepita (1937).

2 Rue Laffitte, Paris

 
2 Rue Laffitte, Paris, formerly the hôtel d'Aubeterre or townhouse of the Aubeterre family, with a full-height bowed-projection at the corner, was situated on the corner of Rue Laffitte and the Boulevard des Italiens. It faced on the other side of the Rue Laffitte the famous Restaurant de la Maison-d'Or. The street contained the shops of several art dealers. It was purchased by the 4th Marquess of Hertford, when his mother vacated it to live at 1 rue Taitbout, the next street 50 metres to the west. After Wallace's death it was eventually inherited by his secretary Sir John Murray Scott, during whose ownership the house and contents are described by Vita Sackville-West in Pepita, her biography of her mother Lady Sackville (Scott's mistress), who ultimately inherited the contents, which she sold in 1914 to the dealer Jacques Seligmann for £270,000 (£35 million in 2022) and of which the Wallace Collection was therefore deprived: 
A vast apartment on the first floor turning the corner of the Boulevard des Italiens and the Rue Laffitte with twenty windows opening on either street was in itself a treasure-house which brought visitors from every part of Europe. I shall never forget the enchantment of that house. From the moment one had pulled the string and the big door had swung open admitting one to the interior courtyard where grooms in wooden clogs seemed perpetually to be washing carriages; the whole house belonged to him though he reserved only the first floor for himself .... the real glory of the house lay in the main apartment—room after room opened one into the other so that standing in the middle one could look down a vista of shining brown parquet floors at ivory-coloured boisieries on either side. Here indeed one had the 18th century illusion at its height. All around silent and sumptuous stood the priceless furniture of the Wallace Collection.

Queensberry Estate, Newmarket, Suffolk
This estate came to the Hertfords via Mie-Mie, wife of the 3rd Marquess and illegitimate daughter of the 4th Duke of Queensbury. The Bury and Norwich Post reported on 3 January 1882: "It is stated that Sir Richard Wallace has decided upon laying out and cutting up his Queensberry Estate, at Newmarket, for building purposes. They include two estates, one at either end of the town, so that persons wishing to reside near the race-course or near the railway can have their choice. As the town of Newmarket extends, these estates will become incorporated with it. The architect entrusted by Sir R. Wallace with the laying out of the estate is Mr. R. A. Came, of 27, Mecklenburg Square".

Marriage and illegitimate issue

On 15 February 1871, six months after the death of the 4th Marquess and having received his paternal inheritance, he married his long-term mistress Amélie Julie Charlotte Castelnau (1819–1897), known as Amélie, whom he had met in his youth when she was working as a dressmaker or sales-assistant in a perfume shop, an illegitimate daughter of Bernard Castelnau, said by some sources to have been "a French officer" and by others "a 36-year-old homme de confiance (factotum)" with her mother being an "ouvrière en linge (linen maid)". Thirty years before the marriage he had an illegitimate son by Amélie, named Georges Henry Edmond Castelnau (1840–1887), (later known as "Edmond Richard Wallace") born in 1840 (who predeceased his parents). In 1842, two years after the birth of his son, Richard Jackson was christened as "Richard Wallace", possibly in anticipation of a church wedding to Amélie, at which he would require a certificate of baptism. On 24 November 1871, six months after the marriage, Wallace was created a baronet, "of Hertford House, London", for his philanthropy to English ex-patriots during the Siege of Paris and the couple moved to England, where Amélie, by then Lady Wallace, lived from 1872 until her death in 1897. Amélie was not the ideal wife for Wallace in his new station in life as a famous millionaire socialite and art-collector as she spoke no English, and refused to do so, did not enjoy social events and with little interest in fine art was said to have unrefined taste. Baron Ferdinand de Rothschild wrote of her that "she dragged him down to her level, clogged his whole future, and marred all his prospects". After Wallace's final return to France she spent the rest of her life at Hertford House in London. By Amélie he had, before the marriage, one son, which made him permanently illegitimate under English law (but not under French law) and therefore unable to inherit the baronetcy:
Capt. Edmond Richard Wallace (1840–1887), who in 1849 was baptized "Georges Henry Edmond Castelnau", but who on 11 February 1871, aged 31, was officially and legally recognised by Wallace as his son under the name "Edmond Richard Wallace". He served in the French army during the Prussian War, under General Joseph Vinoy, and was made a chevalier de la Légion d'Honneur. Bohemian by nature, he was unwilling to conform to Wallace's wish for him to become an English gentleman and to reside on the Lisburn estate in Northern Ireland. He had for many years as the heir apparent dutifully attended his father in England during important events, for example the first ceremonial visit to Lisburn, and at the shooting parties at Sudbourne, but his attendance became increasingly rare as he spent more time in France. Rather than marrying a suitable English lady, he felt loyalty to his mistress Suzanne Amélie Gall and to his four illegitimate children, and his decision to remain in France caused a split with his parents which was unresolved at the time of his early death in 1887, aged 47, predeceasing both parents. He left the following illegitimate issue, three boys and one girl, who were all largely unrecognised by Wallace and his wife:
General Georges Richard Wallace (1872–1941), of the French Army, eldest son. He served in World War I as a captain in the 22nd Dragoons, was wounded five times and mentioned nine times in dispatches for conspicuous gallantry, for which he was appointed as a Commander of the Legion of Honour and received the Croix de Guerre. In 1980 his three daughters were living, one of whom Odette Wallace (1911–2000) married Jacques Pol-Roger, head of the champage house of that name. Her friendship with Winston Churchill led to the house developing the Cuvée Sir Winston Churchill. 
Henry Richard Wallace (1875–1942), second son, a soldier who became a Chevalier of the Legion of Honour.
Lt. Edmond Richard Wallace (1876–28 February 1915), who was "killed at point blank range by a bullet in the head" at Vauquois on the Meuse, his regiment having been destroyed. He is honoured on his death certificate as "Died for France". 
Georgette Wallace (1878–1947), a noted opera singer known as "Lucy Arbell".

Return to France
Following the refusal of Queen Victoria to allow him a special remainder for his baronetcy to descend to his illegitimate son, and the estrangement of the latter in 1879 and the latter's death in 1887, Wallace's dream of creating his own English dynasty crumbled, and he returned to France to live in retirement at the Bagatelle. He attempted to plan the donation of his Collection to the British government, but his poor health and decreasing interest in business matters led to no progress. His wife remained in England at Hertford House, where she lived with their secretary John Murray Scott, who became to her as an adopted son.

Wallace Collection
Wallace expanded the art collection built by his grandfather and father, the 3rd and 4th Marquesses of Hertford, mainly with additions of mediaeval and Renaissance objects and European arms and armour. The Wallace Collection remains today in its essential character the product of the 4th Marquess, "one of the greatest collectors of the nineteenth century", whom Wallace, as his secretary and agent for many years, assisted in its management. Wallace's widow, to whom he bequeathed all his property, in turn bequeathed the Wallace Collection to the nation in 1897, as her husband had wished, and with the encouragement of John Murray Scott. The bequest comprised only the works of art on the ground and first floors of Hertford House, but everything else (the lease of Hertford House, the Rue Laffitte house, the Chateau de Bagatelle in Paris, and the Lisburn estate in Ireland) was bequeathed by Lady Wallace to John Murray Scott. The Collection is now located in Hertford House in Manchester Square, London, Wallace's townhouse, which the Government purchased from Sir John Murray Scott.

Siege of Paris

Wallace achieved fame during the Siege of Paris for notable acts of charity.
    At his own expense, Wallace organized two full scale ambulances to operate during the siege; one to serve French wounded, and the second for the benefit of sick and destitute Britons.

By the end of the siege, Wallace is estimated to have privately contributed as much as 2.5 million (1870) francs to the needy of Paris. This is perhaps equivalent to $6.5 million in 2010 money. As a result, Wallace was thought to be the most popular British citizen inhabiting Paris during the siege. The last balloon to leave Paris before its capitulation was named for him, as was a Paris boulevard. After the destruction of the Protestant Temple in Neuilly-sur-Seine, he financed its reconstruction in 1872. He was appointed to the Legion d'Honneur for his efforts.

Wallace was created baronet in 1871 and was a Conservative and Unionist Member of Parliament for Lisburn from 1873 to 1885.  In 1872 he donated 50 drinking fountains, known as Wallace fountains, to Paris and to Lisburn. Some can still be seen today. Thaxton Village, Lisburn, has a network of streets named after Sir Richard and Lady Wallace.

He died unexpectedly at the Chateau de Bagatelle on 20 July 1890 and was buried in the Hertford family's mausoleum in the Père Lachaise Cemetery in Paris.

Archives 
A number of letters written to Wallace by members of the British Royal Family are held at the Cadbury Research Library (University of Birmingham), along with letters written to his secretary John Murray Scott.

References

Further reading 

Higgott, Suzanne, The Most Fortunate Man of His Day: Sir Richard Wallace: Connoisseur, Collector, Philanthropist, London, Trustees of the Wallace Collection, 2018 (the author is a curator of the Wallace Collection)
Burns, J.F., The Life and Work of Sir Richard Wallace, Bart., MP, Lisburn Historical Society, Volume 3, Part 2, 1980 (Synopsis of an Address given by J. F. Burns, Belfast to the members of the Parent-Teachers' Association of Wallace, High School, Lisburn, on Tuesday, 29th April, 1980, in connection with the centenary of the foundation of the School)
Falk, Bernard, Old Q.'s Daughter, The History of a Strange Family, published by Cedric Chivers, Portway Bath, 1970 (biography of Maria Emily Fagnani (3rd Marchioness of Hertford), with information on Wallace)

External links 

The Life and Work of Sir Richard Wallace Bart. MP
Website of the Wallace Collection 
The Wallace High School
Lisburn City
Lisburn City Council

English art collectors
Museum founders
English people of Scottish descent
Members of the Parliament of the United Kingdom for County Antrim constituencies (1801–1922)
Irish Conservative Party MPs
Wallace, Richard, 1st Baronet
1818 births
1890 deaths
Burials at Père Lachaise Cemetery
UK MPs 1868–1874
UK MPs 1874–1880
UK MPs 1880–1885
People from Lisburn
People associated with the Wallace Collection
People from Orford, Suffolk